Gift of the Gab may refer to:

Eloquence, fluent, forcible, elegant or persuasive speaking
"The Gift of Gab", a 1955 short story by Jack Vance
Gift of Gab (film), a black-and-white film released in 1934 by Universal Pictures
Gift of Gab (rapper), American musician, member of Blackalicious
Irish legend of the Blarney Stone
The Gift of Gab, a 2018 studio album by American rapper E-40